"Over the Shoulder" is a song by American industrial band Ministry, from their second studio album, Twitch (1986). Written by frontman Al Jourgensen, produced by Adrian Sherwood, and released in November 1985 as a 12-inch single, it was the band’s first recording after signing with Sire Records; the accompanying music video was directed by Peter Christopherson.

Composition 
"Over the Shoulder" has been described as an early example of electro-industrial, as well as synth-pop and synthrock. On Twitch, it is the fifth track with a length of five minutes and thirteen seconds; the single version is six minutes and forty-four seconds long. Musically, the song contains multiple layers of looped synthesizer parts along with distinctive heavy drum machine pattern and Jourgensen's weak vocal approach; Billboard editors compared this approach with music of Scritti Politti and Bee Gees, while in 2006, Miami New Times''' Jean Carey wrote that the song "sounds like a giant mosquito." In a later review for the March 1986 issue of Spin Magazine, columnist John Leland praised Sherwood's work with Ministry's “typically banal ideas.”

The single version of "Over the Shoulder" and "Isle of Man" were included as additional tracks on compact disc edition of Twitch in 1990; the song was also to be featured on a 2001 compilation album Greatest Fits, but was left off due to medium limitations.

 Music video 
The music video for "Over the Shoulder" was directed by Peter Christopherson. It consists of footage of two teenagers stealing a car, trashing a grocery store, making a nails-and-motor oil omelet, and driving off with no apparent consequence.

According to Jourgensen, the director hired two kids to perform actions featured in the video. When the band asked to film in a store, the owner refused. The director allegedly paid the same kids to break into the store and trash it, and the band asked once again. The owner, needing money to pay for cleanup, agreed. As Jourgensen put it, "Everything that happened on that video was criminal."

In 2000, the video of “Over the Shoulder” was featured on compilation album Tapes of Wrath.

 Track listing 

 Personnel 
Credits adapted from liner notes of Twitch''.
 Al Jourgensen – songwriting, musical performance
 Adrian Sherwood – production

Notes

References

Bibliography 
 

Ministry (band) songs
Songs written by Al Jourgensen
Sire Records singles
1985 songs
Song recordings produced by Adrian Sherwood